This is a list of National Historic Sites in Manitoba. There are 57 National Historic Sites designated in the province, eight of which are administered by Parks Canada. This list uses names designated by the national Historic Sites and Monuments Board, which may differ from other names for these sites.

Numerous National Historic Events also occurred across Manitoba, and are identified at places associated with them using the same style of federal plaques that marks National Historic Sites. Several National Historic Persons are commemorated throughout the province in the same way. The markers do not indicate which designation—a Site, Event, or Person—a subject has been given.

National Historic Sites

See also

 History of Manitoba
 List of historic places in Manitoba

References

 
Manitoba
National Historic Sites of Canada